Nenad Stefanović (born 31 August 1985) is a Serbian professional basketball coach and former player who is the head coach for FMP of the ABA League, Basketball League of Serbia and Basketball Champions League.

Playing career 
A point guard, Stefanović spent his playing career in Serbia, Poland, Montenegro, and Sweden. During his playing days, he played for OKK Beograd, Sloga, Partizan, FMP Železnik, Polpak Swiecie, KK Mogren Budva, Borac Čačak, Metalac, Radnički Kragujevac, Tamiš, Smederevo 1953, Stockholm Eagles, 08 Stockholm, and Žarkovo. He retired as a player with Žarkovo in 2014.

Coaching career 
After retirement in 2014, Stefanović joined a youth system of Žarkovo as the U19 head coach. He was also the head coach of Zemun from 2016–2020. He was an assistant coach for OKK Beograd in the 2020–21 Serbian League season.

On 2 June 2021, FMP hired Stefanović as their new head coach.

Career achievements
As player
 Serbia and Montenegro League champion: 1  (with Partizan: 2005–06)

As head coach
 First Regional League (Central Division) of Serbia champion: 1  (with Zemun: 2017–18)

References

External links
 Stefanović ABA League Profile
 Player Profile at eurobasket.com

1985 births
Living people
ABA League players
Basketball League of Serbia players
KK Zemun coaches
KK Borac Čačak players
KK FMP (1991–2011) players
KK Metalac Valjevo players
KK Partizan players
KK Radnički Kragujevac (2009–2014) players
KK Sloga players
KK Smederevo players
KK Tamiš players
KK Žarkovo players
OKK Beograd players
Point guards
Serbian expatriate basketball people in Montenegro
Serbian expatriate basketball people in Poland
Serbian expatriate basketball people in Sweden
Serbian men's basketball coaches
Serbian men's basketball players
Shooting guards
Sportspeople from Užice